Film Journal International was a motion-picture industry trade magazine published by the American company Prometheus Global Media. It was a sister publication of Adweek, Billboard, The Hollywood Reporter, and other periodicals.

History and profile
Launched in 1934 and published monthly, Film Journal International covered exhibition, production, and distribution, reporting both U.S. and international news, with features on industry trends, movie theater design and technology, screen advertising, and other topics. It was the official magazine of the industry conventions ShoWest, ShowEast, Cinema Expo International, and CineAsia.

In 2008, it was based at 770 Broadway, New York City, New York. Its last editor and publisher was Robert Sunshine, and the executive editor was Kevin Lally. Its film critics included Lewis Beale, Frank Lovece, Maitland McDonagh, Rebecca Pahle, David Noh, and Doris Toumarkine. Rex Roberts was the associate editor and graphic designer, and as of 2016, Sarah Sluis was the assistant editor/staff writer, a post previously held by Katey Rich.

On October 22, 2018, Film Journal International merged with Box Office Pro, effectively ending the journal.

References

External links

1934 establishments in New York (state)
Film magazines published in the United States
Monthly magazines published in the United States
Entertainment trade magazines
Magazines established in 1934
Magazines published in New York City